Kestrel, in comics, may refer to:

 Kestrel (Marvel Comics), a test subject of the Weapon X Project
 Kestrel (DC Comics), the supervillain archenemy of Hawk and Dove
 Kestrel (Marvel UK), a member of Gene Dogs
 Kestrel, an NSA agent and short-lived foe of Black Widow.

See also 
 Kestrel (disambiguation)

References